HMS Queen Charlotte was a 104-gun first-rate ship of the line of the Royal Navy, launched on 17 July 1810 at Deptford. She replaced the first  sunk in 1800.

Career
A Black sailor from Grenada named William Brown was discharged from Queen Charlotte in 1815 for being a woman.

She was Lord Exmouth's flagship during the Bombardment of Algiers in 1816.

On 17 September 1817, Linnet, a tender to Queen Charlotte, seized a smuggled cargo of tobacco. The officers and crew of Queen Charlotte shared in the prize money.

On 17 December 1823, Queen Charlotte was driven into the British ship Brothers at Portsmouth, Hampshire, England. Brothers suffered severe damage in the collision.

Fate

Queen Charlotte was converted to serve as a training ship in 1859 and renamed HMS Excellent. She was eventually sold out of the service to be broken up in 1892.

Notes, citations, and references
Notes

Citations

References

 Lavery, Brian (2003): The Ship of the Line - Volume 1: The development of the battlefleet 1650-1850. Conway Maritime Press. .
 Winfield, Rif (2008): British Warships in the Age of Sail: 1793 - 1817. Seaforth Publishing. .

External links
 

 

Ships of the line of the Royal Navy
1810 ships
Ships of the West Africa Squadron
Maritime incidents in December 1823